Bridgend is a residential area of Perth, Scotland, approximately  east of the city centre, on the eastern banks of the River Tay. It is in Kinnoull parish. A settlement has existed here since at least the 16th century.

The main access roads to Bridgend from the centre of Perth are West Bridge Street (the A85, which crosses Perth Bridge) and South Street (which crosses Queen's Bridge).

Due to its location at the bottom of a hill rising to the east, the junction of Main Street and Gowrie Street (known as Bridgend Cross) has become prone to flooding. Torrential rains in July 2011 damaged homes and business after rivers of water flowed down Lochie Brae and Bowerswell Road. After a similar occurrence in September 2015, discussions began about installing flood defences.

Listed buildings
The following buildings in Bridgend are listed structures:

1 West Bridge Street (former tollbooth, later J. S. Lees Fish & Poultry Shop)
1, 3 Commercial Street (formerly the Cross Keys Hotel)
Main Street, numbers 1–5
Main Street, numbers 2–16
Main Street, 7, 9, 11
Inchbank, 26 Main Street
Earnoch, Main Street
Newlands, Main Street
Inveraven, Main Street
Riversdale, Main Street
Springbank, Main Street (divided into three flats)
Ardchoille Lodge, Strathmore Street (formerly Rosemount, later Perth and Kinross District Police)

Amenities
The Bridgend Inn, a Tennent's pub, is located at 69 Main Street, while the Strathmore Bar is at 43 Main Street. The latter was the Strathmore Hotel around the turn of the 20th century and was advertised as having livery stables. Its proprietors in 1907 were Watt and Ramsay.

Bridgend was without its own post office for over a decade, until one opened on West Bridge Street in March 2020, but closed again in April 2022 due to "lower than expected footfall".

Notable people
James Croll, scientist (1821–1890), worked for Bridgend coffee merchant David Irons
James Forbes, botanist (1773–1861)
John Murray Robertson, architect (1844–1901), died at Crossmount in Bridgend
George Seton, philanthropist (1822–1908)

Gallery

References

External links
"Kinnoull Conservation Area Appraisal" – Perth and Kinross Council, includes a townscape analysis of Bridgend
Bridgend – Scottish-Places.info
Footage from 1936 of Bridgend from the Perth side of Smeaton's Bridge – "The Town of the Tay – Perth", British Pathé, YouTube, 13 April 2014

Populated places in Perth, Scotland